Mark Horden Baker (born 31 December 1958) is an Australian politician.  He was elected as a Liberal Party of Australia member of the Australian House of Representatives in October 2004, for the Division of Braddon, Tasmania.  He was educated in Tasmania, and holds various trade and academic qualifications.

In the past, his community involvement has included member of  both the Devonport and Launceston Chamber of Commerce; the Motor Neurone Disease Association of Tasmania; he has also been a board member of the Tasmanian Football Club in 2002. In 2002 Mark was elected President of the Road Trauma Support Team Tasmania. He has worked as a carpenter/joiner, a teacher, and most recently, as a financial adviser. He was defeated for reelection in 2007 by Labor's Sid Sidebottom but held the swing against him to just 2% in the face of a nationwide swing to the ALP of 6%.

External links
Official site

1958 births
Living people
Liberal Party of Australia members of the Parliament of Australia
Members of the Australian House of Representatives
Members of the Australian House of Representatives for Braddon
21st-century Australian politicians